|}

This is a list of electoral region results for the Western Australian Legislative Council in the 1977 Western Australian state election.

Results by Electoral province

Central 

 Preferences were not distributed.

East Metropolitan

Lower Central

Lower North

Lower West

Metropolitan 

 Preferences were not distributed.

North Province

North Metropolitan

North-East Metropolitan

South Province

South Metropolitan

South-East

South-East Metropolitan

South West 

 Preferences were not distributed.

Upper West

West

See also 

 Results of the Western Australian state election, 1977 (Legislative Assembly)
 1977 Western Australian state election
 Candidates of the 1977 Western Australian state election
 Members of the Western Australian Legislative Council, 1977–1980

References 

Results of Western Australian elections
1977 elections in Australia